Martin Hardie (born 22 April 1976) is a Scottish football coach, former footballer, and current manager of Lowland League side BSC Glasgow.

Hardie started his career with Queen's Park in 1996, subsequently playing for eight different clubs, including two spells at Partick Thistle and also playing for both guises of Airdrieonians.

Career

Upon joining St Johnstone, Hardie was suspended for the opening game of the 2006–07 season. He marked his debut for the club just three days later with a goal in a 3–1 win over East Fife in the League Cup. On 27 January 2007, Hardie scored late winner for second-placed St Johnstone against top-of-the-table Gretna at McDiarmid Park. The win closed the gap between the two teams to nine points, as Saints pushed Gretna to the last day in the championship race. Hardie was named Division One's Player of the Month for March 2007. Hardie also scored Saints' only goal in a 2–1 defeat against Celtic in a Scottish Cup semi final played in April 2007.

During a Scottish Cup semi final against Rangers in April 2008, a late challenge by Hardie damaged Steven Naismith's cruciate ligament. Hardie apologised to Naismith, who had been his teammate at Kilmarnock, for the tackle after the game.

Playing for Dunfermline Athletic, Hardie scored 8 goals for the side as they won the Scottish First Division in 2011. His appearances included a vital last minute goal against Ross County in a 1–0 win, and two goals to beat Raith Rovers 2–1 in a title deciding game. He opened his second season account with Dunfermline with a 30-yard top corner free-kick. It came in the last minute against Inverness Caledonian Thistle to gain a point and further demonstrated his prowess as a set piece specialist.

In July 2012, Hardie signed for Greenock Morton. He was released at the end of the season. On 18 July 2013 Martin Hardie signed for Airdrieonians on a 1-year contract however he left the club in January 2014, retiring from professional football.

Hardie was appointed manager of BSC Glasgow on 8 May 2021.  in July 2021 he was relieved of his duties without having managed the team in a competitive game.

Honours
Partick Thistle
 Scottish Football League Second Division: Winners 2000–01
 Scottish Football League First Division: Winners 2001–02

St Johnstone
 Scottish League Challenge Cup: Winners 2007–08
 Scottish Football League First Division: Winners 2008–09

Dunfermline Athletic
 Scottish Football League First Division: Winners 2010–11

Morton
 Scottish Football League First Division: Runners-Up 2012–13

References

External links

1976 births
Living people
People from Alexandria, West Dunbartonshire
Scottish footballers
Association football midfielders
Queen's Park F.C. players
East Stirlingshire F.C. players
Kilmarnock F.C. players
Airdrieonians F.C. players
St Johnstone F.C. players
Partick Thistle F.C. players
Dunfermline Athletic F.C. players
Scottish Football League players
Scottish Premier League players
Greenock Morton F.C. players
Scottish Junior Football Association players
Yoker Athletic F.C. players
Scottish Professional Football League players
Footballers from West Dunbartonshire
Scottish football managers
Broomhill F.C. (Scotland) managers